= Euronetpol =

EuronetPol is an official EU agency set up in 2009 to monitor social media sites for material that is seen to endorse or promote terror.

Its remit also includes hate speech, particularly with regard to matters of race, gender, sexuality and sectarianism.

It is estimated that its work has led to nearly 3000 prosecutions across the EU since 2009. The number of prosecutions each year has risen from 300 in 2009 to over 1000 in 2013. There have been 700 prosecutions in the UK.

Every country currently in the Eurozone has signed up to euronetPol.

== Structure ==
Little has been made public about the structure of the agency. Its operatives are thought to sift through social media sites in every region targeting key words. Information may then be passed on to local law enforcement agencies for investigation or further action.
